Shane Moran (born 1961) is an Australian businessman working in the Australian health care and aged care sectors. Moran was the CEO of the Moran Health Group for fifteen years, during which time the group became the largest private residential aged care provider in Australia. In 2001, Moran set up the Provectus Care Group, which owns and operates aged care facilities in Australia and China.

Personal life and education
Moran was born in Sydney, Australia, the second son and fourth child of Douglas and Greta Moran. Shane and his three brothers attended secondary school at St Joseph's College, Hunters Hill. In his senior years he represented the college in athletics AAGPS (NSW) Athletics and rowing and played rugby on the wing in the college's first XV and was picked as a GPS rugby representative in 1978 and 1979. In his final year 1979, he won the college's Ancient History prize and was selected as a NSW 1st XV state schoolboy rugby representative.

Moran obtained degrees in Commerce and Law from the University of New South Wales, as well as a Masters of Law (International Business) and Advanced Management from Harvard Business School. He commenced Chinese language studies in 1986 and speaks Mandarin, French, Spanish and German. In 2001 Moran completed a Doctor in Philosophy (PhD) in Health, writing his doctoral thesis on the pending aged care crisis in China.

Health and aged care business
In 1987 Moran was appointed chief executive officer of the family-owned Moran Health Care Group, which became Australia's largest private seniors' living and residential aged care provider during his fifteen-year tenure. During this time the group operated over 120 aged care facilities across Australia, the United Kingdom, Channel Islands and Singapore and ten private surgical, medical and rehabilitation hospitals across New South Wales and Queensland.

In 1988, Moran became a founding director of the National Association of Nursing Homes and Private Hospitals of Australia and was a foundation director of HESTA (the Health Employees Superannuation Trust of Australia).

In 2001 Moran fell out with his father over the direction being taken in relation to the British side of the Moran Health Care business. Shane departed as chief executive of the Moran Health Care Group.

In 2001 Moran set up the Provectus Care Group, which operates high-end aged care and seniors' living facilities in Australia and China. In the mid 2000s, Moran was the major shareholder and founder of Pulse Health Limited (ASX: PHG) (previously known as Biometrics Ltd (ASX: BIX)), which built up a number of private hospitals and other health care services across regional Australia. On 16 May 2017, Healthe Care Australia, Australia's third largest corporate private hospital operator and pan-Asian health care services group, acquired Pulse Health's 13 hospital portfolio.

By 2006 Moran and his sister Kerry Jones had commenced legal proceedings against the trustee of the family trust. In 2011 the Anglican Archbishop of Sydney Dr Peter Jensen helped resolve the proceedings. Doug Moran died in November 2011. Shane and his two surviving brothers have all stayed in the aged-care industry with each running their own distinct ventures.

Restoration of heritage properties

The Moran family has had a long association with the restoration of national and state significant heritage properties in Australia including Juniper Hall in Paddington, the federation properties Rosemorran in Wahroonga and Redleaf (also in Wahroonga and winner of the national Lachlan Macquarie Award for restoration), and the Hardy Wilson designed Blandford in Leura. In 2013 Moran bought out the last remaining family interest of the historic property Swifts. The property was originally purchased by the Moran family in 1997. It is regarded as “one of Sydney’s most famous houses”. He has since overseen what is considered to be one of Australia's largest private heritage restorations on the property. Since 2016 he has also acquired and fully restored Sydney's historic  property Darling House, The Rocks, which is also registered as an item of both national, state and local heritage significance on the Register of the National Estate, the New South Wales State Heritage Register and the Sydney Local Environment Plan.

References

Living people
1961 births
Australian chief executives
University of New South Wales alumni
People educated at St Joseph's College, Hunters Hill